True Stories and Other Dreams is the ninth studio album by American singer and songwriter Judy Collins, released by Elektra Records in 1973. It peaked at No. 27 on the Billboard Pop Albums charts.

The album included Valerie Carter's "Cook With Honey", which returned Collins to the U.S. pop singles top-forty, as well as Tom Paxton's song "The Hostage" about the 1971 Attica Prison riots. It also included a number of Collins' own compositions, including "The Fisherman Song", which she would later perform on Sesame Street.

Track listing
All tracks composed by Judy Collins; except where indicated

 "Cook With Honey" (Valerie Carter) – 3:29
 "So Begins the Task" (Stephen Stills) – 3:11
 "Fisherman Song" – 3:56
 "The Dealer (Down and Losin')" (Bob Ruzicka) – 3:55
 "Secret Gardens" – 5:30
 "Holly Ann" – 4:47
 "The Hostage" (Tom Paxton) – 2:52
 "Song for Martin" – 5:05
 "Che" – 7:32

Personnel
Judy Collins – vocals, guitar, piano, keyboards
Bob Daugherty – bass
Russell George – bass
Bill Keith – steel guitar
Louis Killen – concertina
Steve Mandell – guitar
Jerry Matthews – guitar
Ray Barretto – conga
Don Brooks – harmonica
Larry Packer – fiddle
Bucky Pizzarelli – guitar
Paul Prestopino – harp
Allan Schwartzberg – drums, percussion
Eric Weissberg – guitar, banjo, bass

Production notes
Produced by Mark Abramson
Engineered by Shelly Yakus and Jay Messina

References

1973 albums
Judy Collins albums
Albums produced by Mark Abramson
Elektra Records albums